Fang Yaoqing (Chinese: 方耀庆; born 20 April 1996) is a Chinese athlete specialising in the triple jump. He represented his country at the 2017 World Championships without reaching the final. Earlier, he won two silver medals at the 2013 World Youth Championships.

His personal bests in the event are 17.17 metres outdoors (+0.2 m/s, Chongqing 2019) and 17.20 metres indoors (Nur-Sultan 2023).

International competitions

References

1996 births
Living people
Chinese male long jumpers
Chinese male triple jumpers
World Athletics Championships athletes for China
Athletes (track and field) at the 2020 Summer Olympics
Olympic athletes of China
21st-century Chinese people